Major Frank G. Robinson was a Canadian ice hockey executive and soldier from Montreal. He was an owner of the Toronto Blueshirts ice hockey team and later, president of the National Hockey Association (NHA), predecessor organization of the National Hockey League (NHL).

National Hockey Association

In 1911, Robinson, Toronto businessman Percy Quinn and other investors purchased an NHA franchise from Ambrose O'Brien, founder of the NHA. In 1912–13, the team, the Toronto Professional Hockey Club, or Toronto Blueshirts as they were nicknamed took to the ice. In 1913–14, the club won the NHA championship and the Stanley Cup. In 1916, Quinn and Robinson sold the franchise to Eddie Livingstone, owner of the Toronto Ontarios/Shamrocks.

Robinson was elected president of the NHA after the resignation of Emmett Quinn in October 1916. Despite being re-elected in October, 1917 for a second term, Robinson would only serve as president of the league for one year. During his term, bickering between team owners led to the suspension of the Toronto franchise and its players taken by the other franchises. Robinson opposed the moves of the owners and resigned due to his position being ineffective.

References

Notes

Toronto Blueshirts
Year of birth missing
Year of death missing